Clooney-Quin GAA is a Gaelic Athletic Association club located in the village areas of Clooney and Quin, County Clare in Ireland. The club field teams in hurling and Gaelic Football. The club was founded in 1888 and its most notable player was Amby Power, who captained the Clare 1914 All-Ireland winning team.

In 2017, Clooney-Quin reached their first county senior final in 73 years where they lost to Sixmilebridge after a replay.

Major honours
 Clare Senior Hurling Championship (1): 1942 (as Clooney)
 Munster Intermediate Club Hurling Championship (1): 2006
 Clare Intermediate Hurling Championship (3): 1934 (as Clooney), 1986 (as Clooney), 2006
 Clare Junior A Hurling Championship (2): 1933 (as Clooney), 1966 (as Clooney)
 Clare Junior A Football Championship (2): 2004, 2009
 Clare Minor A Hurling Championship (1): 2006, 2022

Noted hurlers
Amby Power
Peter Duggan

References

External links
Official Site

Gaelic games clubs in County Clare
Hurling clubs in County Clare